Nii is a Trans–New Guinea language of the Chimbu–Wahgi branch spoken in the highlands of Papua New Guinea.

References

Further reading
 

Chimbu–Wahgi languages
Languages of Western Highlands Province